Bernard Lokai (born 5 September 1960 Bohumin, Czechoslovak Socialist Republic) is a German painter. He studied at the Kunstakademie Düsseldorf and was a student of Gerhard Richter, and part of the Young Figuratives movement. He lives and works in Düsseldorf and Berlin, Germany. In 2002 he began teaching at the Freie Kunstakademie Essen in Essen in the Department of Painting and Graphics.

Life 
After his parents left the Czechoslovak Socialist Republic Bernard Lokai grew up in Düren, Germany. After finishing high school he began to study art at Kunstakademie Düsseldorf in 1982. In 1987 he finished the academy as Meisterschüler of Gerhard Richter. At the academy he met the colorfield landscape painter Hans-Jörg Holubitschka, with whom he has participated in several exhibitions as part of the exhibition serial Young Figuratives.

Work 
Bernard Lokai's work incorporates the gestural brushstrokes of Abstract Expressionism and the spray paint of graffiti. His "Landscape Block" works consist of multi-panelled grids composed of eighteen 12 by 16 inch panels, each painted in the studio, then combined into a grid at random.

Art critic Mara Hoberman wrote that Bernard Lokai's Landscape Blocks depict "eighteen land-, sea-, and sky-scapes in disparate styles quoting, in turn, the brushstrokes of Monet, Turner, and Richter (his teacher), among others."

Exhibitions (selection) 
 2017 Galerie Fellner von Feldegg, Krefeld
 2015 Palazzo Albrizzi, Collateralevent of the 56th. Venice Biennale
 2015 Bernard Lokai - Neue Werke (new works), Martin Leyer-Pritzkow Ausstellungen, Düsseldorf, Germany
 2015 hosfelt Gallery, San Francisco, USA
 2014 "4 auf 8" with Armin Baumgarten, Hans-Jörg Holubitschka and Katrin Roeber, Martin Leyer-Pritzkow Ausstellungen, Düsseldorf
 2012 hosfelt Gallery, San Francisco, USA
 2010 hosfelt Gallery, New York City, USA
 2010 Gallery Fellner of Feldegg, Krefeld
 2010 hosfelt Gallery, San Francisco, USA
 2007 Martin Leyer–Pritzkow Ausstellungen, Düsseldorf
 2006 Schloss Burgau, Düren
 2006 Martin Leyer–Pritzkow Ausstellungen, Düsseldorf
 2005 Type fair, Cologne
 2005 Galerie Fellner von Feldegg, Krefeld
 2004 Gallery Fellner of Feldegg, Krefeld
 2004 Art Fair, Cologne
 2004 Museum Ludwig 
 2003 Martin Leyer–Pritzkow Ausstellungen, Düsseldorf
 2003 STE 2003, Prague
 2002 Lüriper 24, Mönchengladbach
 2002 Airport Art, Frankfurt/M.
 2002 Young Figuratives, inter alia with Armin Baumgarten, Hans-Jörg Holubitschka, Peter Lindenberg, Oliver Lochau, Stefan Müller (Stefan Schwarmüller ), Katrin Roeber, Mönchehaus Museum Goslar - Museum of modern and contemporary art, Curator: Martin Leyer-Pritzkow Germany
 2002 Verdi Bildungsstätte, Kochelsee Germany
 2001 Young Figuratives, Junge Figurative, Carolinenpalais, Ketterer München Munich
 2001 Freie Kunstschule, Essen
 2000 Martin Leyer-Pritzkow Ausstellungen, Düsseldorf
 2000 Due Dimensione, Germania e Giovane arte in Italia, Deutsche Welle, Cologne
 1999 Galerie Radke, Krefeld
 1996 Leopold-Hoesch Museum, Düren
 1996 Galerie Jasim, Düsseldorf
 1996 Atrium Gallery, Krefeld
 1994 Galerie Jasim. Düsseldorf

References

External links 
 Literature from and about Bernard Lokai in the German Library
 Official Homepage
 Art works from Bernard Lokai at Martin Leyer-Pritzkow
 "Einfluss", Panel Discussion P1, History of the Kunsthalle Düsseldorf, 18 October 2010, moderated by Laura Richard Janku, with Stefan Kürten, Birgit Jensen e.a.
 S.F. gets an better end of Hosfelt show with N.Y. by Kenneth Baker, in San Francisco Chronicle, 1 January 2011

20th-century German painters
20th-century German male artists
German male painters
21st-century German painters
21st-century German male artists
German abstract artists
Kunstakademie Düsseldorf alumni
1960 births
Living people
People from Bohumín
Artists from North Rhine-Westphalia
Czechoslovak emigrants to Germany